1 Corinthians 2 is the second chapter of the First Epistle to the Corinthians in the New Testament of the Christian Bible. It is authored by Paul the Apostle and Sosthenes in Ephesus, composed between 52–55 CE.

Text 

The original text was written in Koine Greek. This chapter is divided into 16 verses.

Textual witnesses
Some early manuscripts containing the text of this chapter are:
Papyrus 46 (AD 175–225)
Codex Vaticanus (325–350)
Codex Sinaiticus (330–360)
Codex Alexandrinus (400–440)
Codex Ephraemi Rescriptus
Papyrus 14 (6th century; extant verses 6–8)
Papyrus 11 (7th century; extant verses 9–12, 14)

Old Testament references
 1 Corinthians 2:9 references Isaiah 64:4 and Isaiah 65:17
 1 Corinthians 2:16 references Isaiah 40:13

New Testament references
 1 Corinthians 2:1 references Acts 18:1

Paul's preaching ministry in Corinth
Acts 18:1–17 recounts Paul's departure from Athens and his arrival in Corinth. The writer of the Acts of the Apostles states that Paul "testified to the Jews that Jesus is the Christ, but when [the Jews] opposed him and blasphemed, [Paul] shook his garments and said to them, 'Your blood be upon your own heads; I am clean. From now on I will go to the Gentiles'." Lutheran theologian Harold Buls describes Corinth as "was much like the city of Athens. They admired philosophers and orators. They were always sitting around waiting to hear or tell the latest philosophy. Many of them were sophists, teachers of speech and philosophy who came to be disparaged for their oversubtle, self-serving reasoning. Many of them were skilled in devious argumentation." In 1 Corinthians 2:1, Paul recalls that he "did not come with excellence of speech or of wisdom". He states that he spoke "in weakness, in fear, and in much trembling" and "my speech and my preaching were not with persuasive words of human wisdom". Acts reports that:

Verse 2 

Buls notes that "'For' is the explanatory 'you see' and explains verse 1".

The rulers of this age
Paul refers twice to "the archons (rulers, princes) of this age". Dutch theologian Hugo Grotius suggests that the rulers of this age are the "politicians, who adhere to justice and understand history."

Grotius's opinion reflects a time when the religious categories of late antiquity had been all but forgotten, before the rise of modern biblical and classical scholarship. In fact, Paul's reference is to spiritual powers (fallen or rebellious angels) who rule over the nations from on high, in the heavenly places.  This idea of cosmic archons whom Christ has conquered and taken captive through his death and resurrection is a running theme in Paul's theology.

Verse 16 

"Who has known the mind of the Lord[...]?" is either a citation or allusion to Isaiah 40:13. The "scheme of salvation by Jesus Christ" is drawn in his eternal mind with the sense of the Spirit of God in the writings of the Old Testament, so that no natural man could have known any of these things.
"The mind of Christ": the same with "the mind of the Lord", proves that Christ is the Lord. The apostles and ministers of the Gospel, even all true believers, cannot get it from any natural man, but from Christ alone.

See also 
 Crucifixion of Jesus
 Jesus Christ
 Related Bible parts: Isaiah 40, Isaiah 64, Romans 11, 1 Corinthians 1

References

Bibliography

External links 
 King James Bible - Wikisource
English Translation with Parallel Latin Vulgate
Online Bible at GospelHall.org (ESV, KJV, Darby, American Standard Version, Bible in Basic English)
Multiple bible versions at Bible Gateway (NKJV, NIV, NRSV etc.)

02